Bidoupia is a genus of flowering plants belonging to the family Orchidaceae.

Its native range is Vietnam.

Species:

Bidoupia khangii 
Bidoupia phongii

References

Orchids
Orchid genera